Computer-assisted (or aided) qualitative data analysis software (CAQDAS) offers tools that assist with qualitative research such as transcription analysis, coding and text interpretation, recursive abstraction, content analysis, discourse analysis, grounded theory methodology, etc.

Definition
CAQDAS is used in psychology, marketing research, ethnography, public health and other social sciences. The CAQDAS networking project   lists the following tools a CAQDAS program should have:
 Content searching tools
 Coding tools
 Linking tools
 Mapping or networking tools 
 Query tools
 Writing and annotation tools

Comparison of CAQDAS software

Project Exchange Format
In March 2019 the Rotterdam Exchange Format Initiative (REFI) launched a new open exchange standard for qualitative data called QDA-XML. The aim is to allow users to bring coded qualitative data from one software package to another. Initially support was included in Atlas.ti, QDA Miner, Quirkos and Transana, and is now implemented in Dedoose, MAXQDA, NVivo and QualCoder as well, while f4analyse only to Export . Although this was not the first standard to be proposed, it was the first to be implemented by more than one software package, and came as the result of a collaboration between vendors and community representatives from the research community. Previously there was very little capability to bring data in from other software packages.

Pros and cons
Such software helps to organize, manage and analyse information. The advantages of using this software include saving time, managing huge amounts of qualitative data, having increased flexibility, having improved validity and auditability of qualitative research, and being freed from manual and clerical tasks. Concerns include increasingly deterministic and rigid processes, privileging of coding, and retrieval methods; reification of data, increased pressure on researchers to focus on volume and breadth rather than on depth and meaning, time and energy spent learning to use computer packages, increased commercialism, and distraction from the real work of analysis.

See also
Comparison of survey software
Idea networking
Multimethodology
Computer Assisted Mixed Methods Research Analysis Software
Qualitative economics
Qualitative marketing research
Qualitative psychological research
Quantitative research
Sampling (case studies)
Sensemaking

References

-External links 
 The CAQDAS networking project maintained by the University of Surrey offers advice and reviews on various software packages.
 Harald Klein's comprehensive guide to CAQDAS